The European Medical Devices Industry Group (EMIG) is a non-profit trade association, and represents the medical devices industry in Europe as defined by the European Union Medical Devices Directives (93/42/EEC). Karen Howes is the current chair person of EMIG.

See also
 Medical Devices Directive
 Medicines and Healthcare products Regulatory Agency (MHRA)
 COCIR
 European Economic Area (EEA)

Sources
 MEDICAL DEVICES - INTERNATIONAL COOPERATION
 Directory of Study Group 5 Members (GHTF)

Pan-European trade and professional organizations
Economy of Europe